The 2020 Atlantic Coast Conference women's soccer season was the 32nd season of women's varsity soccer in the conference.

Florida State and North Carolina shared the regular season title. The Seminoles won the 2020 ACC Tournament over the Tar Heels, 3-2.

Teams

Stadiums and locations 

1.  Georgia Tech does not sponsor women's soccer
2.  NC State decided to opt out of the 2020 season.

Coaches

Head Coaching Records

Notes
Records shown are prior to the 2020 season
Years at school includes the 2020 season

Pre-season

Impact of the COVID-19 pandemic on the season 

On September 4, 2020 the Atlantic Coast Conference announced the fall Olympic sports schedule, which included the schedule for women's soccer. The men's soccer season will begin in September, 2020 instead of the originally planned August, and conclude on November 1. The season will culminate with the 2020 ACC Women's Soccer Tournament, which will have the usual eight teams, but all games will be played at WakeMed Soccer Park in Cary, North Carolina.

On January 26, 2021 the Atlantic Coast Conference announced that no league matches will be played in the spring.  However, teams were permitted to play non-conference matches, that will count toward their overall records.  The winner of the 2020 ACC Women's Soccer Tournament, Florida State, would receive the conference's automatic bid to the NCAA Tournament.

Hermann Trophy Watchlist 
Due to the ongoing COVID-19 pandemic, a preseason MAC Hermann Trophy watch list was released in January instead of August.  Eight players from ACC schools were named to the watchlist.

Pre-season poll 
The 2020 ACC Preseason Poll was be announced on September 8, 2020.  The defending regular season champions, North Carolina were voted to repeat their regular season crown.  Florida State was voted in second place.  The leagues 14 head coaches also voted on a preseason All-ACC team.  Full results for the coaches poll and preseason team are shown below.

Pre-season Coaches Poll 

Source:

Pre-season All-ACC Team

Source:

Regular season

Conference matrix

The table below shows head-to-head results between teams in conference play.  Each team plays seven matches.  Each team does not play every other team.

Rankings

Fall 2020

United Soccer

Spring 2021

United Soccer

Top Drawer Soccer

Players of the Week

Fall

Spring

Postseason

ACC Tournament

NCAA Tournament

Awards and honors

ACC Awards

2021 NWSL Draft

References 

 
Association football events curtailed due to the COVID-19 pandemic